Adventure Unlimited is a 1965 Australian anthology TV series. It was produced by Lee Robinson and associate produced by Joy Cavill. The directors included Ken Hannam.

Broadcast history
The series was made in 1963, but was not shown in Sydney until 1965, airing on Channel Ten on Friday nights at 7.30. An episode appears to have aired on Thursday, 30 September 1965.

It was not seen in Melbourne until 1968, where it started 15 September. It sold to Canadian television and screened there in 1965.

Episode 1 - "Summer Affair"
Directed by Ken Hannam, written by Michael Plant and Evan Green. Filmed by Carl Kayser and Ron Taylor.

Set on Hayman Island. A drama involving a rich heiress, her husband and a pretty young singer.

Aired Sydney 10 December 1965.

Cast
Tom Oliver
Clarissa Kaye
Ron Haddrick
Gabrielle Hartley

Episode 2 - "The Witness"
Written by Joy Cavill, directed by Robin Lovejoy.

Set in Papua New Guinea – a nun from a Roman Catholic mission on the upper Sepik River was the witness to a murder in Sydney years before, and her testimony could result in a conviction. The story centres around plots to kill her while the police try to bring her back to testify.

Aired in Sydney on 5 November 1965.

Cast 
Owen Weingott
Janette Craig
Bob McDarra
Don Philps
Bell Meek
Mike Maxwell

Episode 3 - "Adventure Unlimited"
Directed by Robin Lovejoy. Photography by Carl Kayser and Ron Taylor.

Set on the Great Barrier reef – two divers are commissioned by a steel company to survey the sands of a section of coast for limestone in the sands – the area is full of sharks and divers go on a shark killing spree when a strange boat turns up with armed men on board. The men steal the divers' boat and proceed to hunt them. The divers ambush them on their own boat and take them prisoner. It turns out they are bringing in illegal aliens.

Aired Sydney 22 October 1965.

The episode was reviewed in the Sydney Morning Herald. Kylie Tennant said "besides being dull it was slow."

Cast
Murray Rose
Richard Meikle
Chips Rafferty
Alexander Cann
Ray Teale
Frank Bailey
Snow Johansen

Episode 4 – "The Coastwatcher"
Directed by Ken Hannam.

The story of coast watcher Arthur Reginald Evans (Fred Parslow), who helped safe the lives of John F. Kennedy and the PT 109 crew after their boat was sliced in two by a Japanese destroyed in the Bracket Strait.

Aired Sydney 19 November 1965

Cast
Fred Parslow as Arthur Evans

Episode 5 – "Crocodile"
Written by Lee Robinson and directed by Robin Lovejoy. Aired in Sydney 29 October 1965.

Premise
Two crocodile hunters are on the trail of Melangie, a giant crocodile valued at £500 if it can be captured alive. The plans go astray when three American women tourists arrive in Arnhem land. They are to record the mating call of the crocodile.

Cast
Chips Rafferty
Gwen Plumb
Mick Larkin
Sophie Stewart
Bonnie Walker

Production
Gwen Plumb wrote in her memoirs that the episode was shot in 1961 in East Arnhem Land, 200 km from Darwin. Plumb wrote "we were told it was a rich man's safari camp where brave sportsmen from all over the world, and particularly America, shot crocodiles, water buffaloes, kangaroos - anything that moved. So Sophie [Stewart] and I packed a couple of cocktail frocks. It was the biggest dump you could ever imagine." Plumb says conditions were unsanitary, water buffalo would wanted through the camp at will", and the camp 'was run by a looney called Alan Stewart who wore a pistol in his belt." A crocodile was brought in from the aquarium in Darwin and Plumb says it passed out in the heat. She enjoyed filming at a lagoon, and a plane that flew in beer every night. "One night it didn't and we mutinied till they send another," wrote Plumb.

Episode 6 – "The Buffalo Hunters"
Written by Cecil Holmes. Producer and directed by Lee Robinson.

Filmed on the Northern Territory in West Arnhem Land – starring Grant Taylor as Ted Abbott, one of the Territory's leading buffalo hunters.

The National Film and Sound Archive listed this as episode 8 but it was the first (possibly second) episode aired in Sydney, on 8 October 1965.

Cast
Grant Taylor as Ted Abbott
Jacqueline Knott
Gay Hartley as Julie Tamar
Alan Stewart as Sam Saunders
Yorkie Tilly as himself
Leonard Teale

Episode 7 – "The Silver Backed Brushes"
It was directed by Ken Hannam and shot by Bill Grimmond and Carl Kayser.

Set in 1942 in Madang, Papua New Guinea, about the Australian Army Women's Medical Service. It tells the true story of nurse Margaret Evans (Mary Reynolds), and her brief marriage to an Airforce pilot (Tom Oliver) which lasted only minutes, as he was killed shielding her with his body during an air raid immediately after the wedding. Written by Joyce Spelling (former colonel in chief of the Australian Women's Auxiliary), directed by Ken Hannam.

It screened 3 December 1965 in Sydney and 13 October 1968 in Melbourne.

Filming took place in New Guinea. It was one of the first professional roles in Australia for Tom Oliver who called the result "awful. Terrible."

Cast
Mary Reynolds as Margaret Evans
Tom Oliver
John Armstrong
Jeanie Drynan
Judith Arthy
Mike Thomas
Thelma Scott.

Episode 8-  "Uncontrolled Territory"
Directed by Robin Lovejoy.

Set in the highlands of Papua New Guinea – a young Australian patrol officer who leads his party to search for the survivors of a plane crash near the Indonesian border. He becomes the first white man to contact a tribe of cannibals.

Aired Sydney: 15 October 1965

Cast
Richard Meikle
Reg Livermore
Chris Christensen

Episode 9 – "Camel Patrol"
Written by Brian Wright and Lee Robinson. Directed by Robin Lovejoy.

Set in the Finke River district (NT) – a young officer takes over the district and undertakes a nine-week camel patrol where he realises the use of the camel and local trackers.

Aired Sydney 26 November 1965.

Cast
Ron Haddrick
Neil Fitzpatrick
Tubba Tubba
Jessica Noad

Episode 10 - "The Rivals"
Directed by Ken Hannam.

Set in Mt. Hagen in P.N.G. – a district show takes place and sees a feud between two coffee growers, Gordan Gillespie (Alexander Archdale) and Bob Cole (Chips Rafferty) with Gordons' boss boy as prize. The competition is a draw & the Bossboy goes off to start his own plantation.

Aired in Sydney 12 November 1965.

Cast
Alexander Archdale as Gordon Gillespie
Chips Rafferty as Bob Cole
Nigel Lovell
Lowell Thomas

Production
Five episodes were shot in New Guinea – "The Rivals", "Uncontrolled Territory", "The Rescue", "The Witness", and "Silver Backed Brushes."

References

Notes

External links
Adventure Unlimited at Milesago
Adventure Unlimited at National Film and Sound Archive

1965 Australian television series debuts
Australian anthology television series